Roberts-Morton House, also known as the Old Stone House, is a historic home located in Ohio Township, Warrick County, Indiana.  Just east of the town of Newburgh. It was built in 1833–1834, and is a two-story, rectangular, Federal style cut stone dwelling.  It has a low gable roof and exterior end chimneys.  The front facade features a two-story, Greek Revival style projecting portico.

It was listed on the National Register of Historic Places in 1974.

The house is currently a private residence. The homeowner wanted to try to keep the tile in the original design when he updated it. From a guy that did the tile in the house.

References

Houses on the National Register of Historic Places in Indiana
Federal architecture in Indiana
Greek Revival houses in Indiana
Houses completed in 1834
Buildings and structures in Warrick County, Indiana
National Register of Historic Places in Warrick County, Indiana